Automobile Association may refer to:

Organisations

Europe
The AA, formerly AA plc, also formerly AA Limited, and formerly The Automobile Association, in the United Kingdom
AA Ireland in Ireland
ADAC in Germany
RACE (automobile association) in Spain

North America
Canadian Automobile Association (CAA) in Canada
American Automobile Association (AAA) in the United States
USAA (United Services Automobile Association) in the United States

Oceania
Australian Automobile Association (AAA) in Australia
New Zealand Automobile Association (AA or NZAA) in New Zealand

Other
Automobile Association of South Africa (AA) in South Africa
Western India Automobile Association (WIAA) in India

Other uses
Fédération Internationale de l'Automobile (FIA), governing body for motor racing